The 1910 Auckland City mayoral election was part of the New Zealand local elections held that same year. In 1910, elections were held for the Mayor of Auckland. The polling was conducted using the standard first-past-the-post electoral method.

Background
Incumbent mayor Charles Grey did not seek re-election and was replaced by Councillor Lemuel Bagnall who defeated Patrick Nerheny and William Richardson. Consequently, a by-election to fill Bagnall's vacated seat was held, which was won by Henry Shaw.

Due to Bagnall's win at the polls for mayor his seat on the city council had been declared vacant. A by-election was held to fill the vacancy the next month which was won by Henry Shaw. William Richardson, who was defeated for the mayoralty also stood for the council seat and was again unsuccessful.

Mayoralty results

Council by-election

Notes

References

Mayoral elections in Auckland
1910 elections in New Zealand
Politics of the Auckland Region
1910s in Auckland